Armin Hamzic (born 30 December 1993) is an Austrian footballer who plays for FC Wacker Innsbruck II.

Career
Hamzic rejoined FC Wacker Innsbruck on 18 January 2019, where he was registered for their reserve team.

References

External links
 
 

Austrian footballers
Association football midfielders
2. Liga (Austria) players
Austrian Football Bundesliga players
FC Wacker Innsbruck (2002) players
1993 births
Living people
Sportspeople from Innsbruck
Footballers from Tyrol (state)